The E. Mead Johnson Award, given by the Society for Pediatric Research, was established in 1939 to honor clinical and laboratory research achievements in pediatrics. The awards are funded by Mead Johnson Nutritionals, a subsidiary of Reckitt Benckiser and are named after Edward Mead Johnson, a co-founder of the originating company Johnson & Johnson.  Two researchers sometimes share a prize.

Award recipients 
Source:
 1939 Frederic A. Gibbs, Dorothy Hansine Andersen
 1940 Robert E. Gross, Lee E. Farr
 1941 René J. Dubos, Albert Sabin
 1942 David Bodian and Howard A. Howe, Harold E. Harrison and Helen C. Harrison
 1943 Hattie E. Alexander, Philip Levine
 1944 Fuller Albright, Josef Warkany
 1945 no awards given
 1946 Horace L. Hodes, Paul A. Harper
 1947 Helen B. Taussig, Louis K. Diamond
 1948 Wolf W. Zuelzer, Benjamin M. Spock
 1949 Nathan B. Talbot, Henry L. Barnett
 1950 Charles D. May and Harry Shwachman, Gertrude Henle and Werner Henle
 1951 William M. Wallace, Victor A. Najjar
 1952 Seymour S. Cohen, Orvar Swenson and Edward B.D. Neuhauser
 1953 Frederick C. Robbins and Thomas H. Weller, Margaret H. Smith
 1954 Robert E. Cooke, Vincent C. Kelley
 1955 Robert A. Good
 1956 David Gitlin, Arnall Patz
 1957 Alfred M. Bongiovanni and Walter R. Eberlein, Albert Dorfman
 1958 William A. Silverman, Norman Kretchmer
 1959 C. Henry Kempe, Barton Childs
 1960 Robert A. Aldrich, Irving Schulman
 1961 Lytt Irvine Gardner, Donald E. Pickering
 1962 Park S. Gerald, Robert L. Vernier
 1963 Daniel Carleton Gajdusek, Richard T. Smith
 1964 Robert M. Chanock, Abraham M. Rudolph
 1965 David Y.-Y Hsia, L. Stanley James
 1966 William H. Tooley, Robert W. Winters
 1967 Henry Neil Kirkman, Henry M. Meyer and Paul D. Parkman
 1968 Mary Ellen Avery, Charles R. Scriver
 1969 Frederick C. Battaglia, Gerard B. Odell
 1970 Myron Winick, Joseph A. Bellanti
 1971 Paul G. Quie, Fred S. Rosen
 1972 Chester M. Edelmann, Frank A. Oski
 1973 Henry L. Nadler, James G. White
 1974 Andre J. Nahmias, E. Richard Stiehm
 1975 John B. Robbins and David H. Smith, Rawle M. McIntosh
 1976 Haig H. Kazazian, David Lawrence Rimoin
 1977 Arthur J. Ammann, Michael E. Miller
 1978 Samuel A. Latt, Pearay L. Ogra
 1979 Philip L. Ballard, Harvey R. Colten
 1980 R. Michael Blaese, S. Michael Mauer
 1981 Robert J. Desnick, Erwin W. Gelfand
 1982 Larry J. Shapiro, Jerry A. Winkelstein
 1983 Laurence A. Boxer, Samuel E. Lux
 1984 Jan L. Breslow, John A. Phillips
 1985 Russell W. Chesney, Augustine Joseph D'Ercole
 1986 Raif Salim Geha, Alan H. Jobe
 1987 Donald C. Anderson, Stuart H. Orkin
 1988 Jeffrey A. Whitsett, Barry Wolf
 1989 Steven M. Reppert, Robert H. Yolken
 1990 Gregory A. Grabowski, Arnold W. Strauss
 1991 Louis M. Kunkel, Ronald G. Worton
 1992 Ann Margaret Arvin, Francis S. Collins and Lap-Chee Tsui
 1993 Edward R.B. McCabe, Alan L. Schwartz
 1994 David A. Williams, David H. Perlmutter
 1995 Margaret K. Hostetter, Alan M. Krensky
 1996 Perrin C. White, Huda Y. Zoghbi
 1997 Donald Y.M. Leung, Elaine Tuomanen
 1998 Jonathan D. Gitlin, James R. Lupski, Jeffrey C. Murray
 1999 Steven H. Abman and Chaim M. Roifman
 2000 Mark A. Kay and Gregg L. Semenza
 2001 Alan D. D'Andrea, Steve A.N. Goldstein
 2002 Nancy C. Andrews, Markus Grompe
 2003 Gregory S. Barsh, Val C. Sheffield
 2004 Bruce D. Gelb, Friedhelm Hildebrandt
 2005 Elizabeth C. Engle, Terence R. Flotte
 2006 James E. Crowe, David Pellman
 2007 Marc E. Rothenberg, Deepak Srivastava
 2008 Todd R. Golub, Victor Nizet
 2009 George Q. Daley, Brendan Lee
 2010 Jean-Laurent Casanova, Fernando Pedro Polack
 2011 Joel Hirschhorn, Eric Vilain
 2012 Scott A. Armstrong, Nicholas Katsanis
 2013 William T. Pu, Bradley L. Schlaggar
 2014 Atul Butte, John Vance Williams
 2015 Ophir Klein, Loren D. Walensky
 2016 Kimberly Stegmaier, Sing Sing Way
 2017 Jordan S. Orange
 2018 Helen Su
 2019 Joshua D. Milner
 2020 Sallie Permar

See also
 List of medicine awards
 List of awards named after people

References 

1939 establishments in the United States
Awards established in 1939
American awards
Medicine awards